Amorbia rectilineana is a species of moth of the family Tortricidae. It is found in Panama.

References

Moths described in 1877
Sparganothini
Moths of Central America